The first season of Idol Kids Puerto Rico premiered on August 5, 2012 and aired until November 12, 2012. It was won by 12-year-old Edgard Hernández and was hosted by Carlos Ponce. Hernández received a scholarship of $15,000 and $5,000 in cash, among other prizes.

Selection process

Auditions
Kids from all over Puerto Rico were invited to audition. The age limit was 6-12 years old.

Semi-finals
The semi-finals began with a total of 20 contestants. In the first semi-final the ten girls competed and five went on to the final rounds. The next semi-final saw the ten boys competing.

The following is a list of Top 20 semi-finalists who failed to reach the finals:

Finals
The following is a list of the contestants who were successful in making the top 10 finals:

Elimination chart

References

External links
Official website

2012 American television seasons
Idols (franchise)